Stewart Linden Bright (born 13 October 1957) is an English former footballer who played as a defender in the Football League for Colchester United.

Career

Born in Colchester, Bright began his playing career with hometown club Colchester United.  He made his debut on 8 November 1975 at the age of 18 in a 1–1 draw with Shrewsbury Town at Layer Road. He was a 10th-minute substitute for John Froggatt after he suffered ligament damage. Bright made 25 league appearances for Colchester with his final appearance coming in a 2–0 away defeat to Scunthorpe United prior to joining Chelmsford City.

References

1957 births
Living people
Sportspeople from Colchester
English footballers
Association football defenders
Colchester United F.C. players
Chelmsford City F.C. players
English Football League players